Milivoje Živanović (2 April 1900 – 15 November 1976) was a renowned Serbian film and stage actor.

References

1900 births
1976 deaths
People from Požarevac
Serbian male stage actors
Serbian male film actors
20th-century Serbian male actors